Anatololacerta ibrahimi, Baran's lizard, is a species of lizard found in Turkey.

References

Anatololacerta
Reptiles described in 1986
Taxa named by Josef Eiselt
Taxa named by Josef Friedrich Schmidtler
Endemic fauna of Turkey